

Buildings and structures

Buildings

 c. 1500 – Chateau de Blois largely rebuilt.
 1500 – St. Anne's Church, Vilnius is completed.
 1501
 Expansion of Holyrood Palace, Edinburgh.
 Chichester Cross is built in Chichester, England.
 Construction of the Jerónimos Monastery at Belém (Lisbon) in Portugal begins; it will take 100 years to complete.
 Construction of spire of St James' Church, Louth, Lincolnshire, England begins; it will take until c.1515 to complete.
 1501/2 – Construction of the Ducal Palace of Vila Viçosa in the Duchy of Braganza (Portugal) begins.
 1502
 Tempietto, San Pietro in Montorio, Rome, designed by Donato Bramante, is built.
 Construction of St. Mary's Church, Gdańsk, begun in 1379 by Heinrich Ungeradin, is completed with the installation of vaulting by Heinrich Haetzl.
 Vladislav Hall in Prague Castle, designed by Benedikt Rejt, is completed.
 Expansion of Great Malvern Priory in England is completed.
 1503 – All Saints' Church, Wittenberg (Schlosskirche) is consecrated.
 1504 – Matsumoto Castle in Japan built.

 1505 – Archangel Cathedral in Moscow begun.
 1505–1508 – Fondaco dei Tedeschi on the Grand Canal (Venice) rebuilt by Fra Giovanni Giocondo.
 1506 – Construction of St. Peter's Basilica in Rome to the design of Bramante begins.
 1507
 Seville Cathedral consecrated.
 Construction of the church of Santa Maria di Loreto, Rome, to the design of Antonio da Sangallo the Younger begins.
 Rebuilding of Wawel Castle in Kraków begins.
 1508
 Church of San Rocco, Venice, designed by Bartolomeo Bon, begun in 1489, is completed.
 Church of Santa Maria della Consolazione (Todi) is begun.
 1509
 Palazzo Loredan on the Grand Canal (Venice), begun by Mauro Codussi in 1481, is completed.
 Fugger Chapel of St. Anne's Church, Augsburg, Swabia, is begun.

Events
 1503: November 1 – Pope Julius II becomes Pope; he will be patron to Bramante, Raphael, and Michelangelo.

Births
 1507: October 1 – Giacomo Barozzi da Vignola, Italian Mannerist architect (died 1573)
 1508: November 30 – Andrea Palladio, Italian architect (died 1580)

Deaths
 c. 1501 – Francesco di Giorgio Martini, Sienese painter, sculptor, architect and military engineer (born 1439)
 1503: June 24 – Reginald Bray, English Chancellor of the Duchy of Lancaster and architect (born 1440)
 c. 1506/07 – Conrad Pflüger, Swabian architect (born c. 1450)

References

Architecture